The 1988 Ithaca Bombers football team represented Ithaca College as a member of the Independent College Athletic Conference (ICAC) during the 1988 NCAA Division III football season. In their 22nd season under head coach Jim Butterfield, the Bombers compiled an 13–1 record and won the NCAA Division III championship, defeating  in the Amos Alonzo Stagg Bowl.

The team played its home games at South Hill Field in Ithaca, New York.

Schedule

References

Ithaca
Ithaca Bombers football seasons
NCAA Division III Football Champions
Ithaca Bombers football